Jean-Jacques Kantorow (born 3 October 1945) is a French violinist and conductor.

His son is the pianist Alexandre Kantorow.

Biography 
Kantorow was born in Cannes, France, into a family of Russian-Jewish origin. From the age of 13 he studied at the Paris Conservatoire with René Benedetti, and in 1960 won the first violin prize. In the 1960s he won ten major international prizes, including first prizes in the Carl Flesch Competition (London), the (Genoa) Paganini Competition, and the Geneva International Competition. Since the 1970s he has been noted for his solo performances in a very wide range of repertoire (from Baroque music to contemporary), and as a chamber music performer. His recordings have won many awards, including the Grand Prix du Disque and the Grand Prix de l’Académie Franz Liszt.
He held senior positions at the Strasbourg and Rotterdam conservatories and at the Conservatoire de Paris, until his retirement from conservatoire violin pedagogy. He continues to teach privately and to give master-classes.

According to Grove Music Online, "Kantorow has an infallible technique and a beauty of tone which combines the best features of the French and Russian schools." He plays a Stradivarius attributed violin, the ‘ex-Leopold Auer’, dated 1699.

In the 1980s he began a separate career as conductor, becoming principal conductor of the Auvergne Chamber Orchestra and later the Ensemble Orchestral de Paris. He has longstanding conducting engagements with other European orchestras, including the Netherlands Chamber Orchestra, the Tapiola Sinfonietta of Finland, the Helsinki Chamber Orchestra, and the Lausanne Chamber Orchestra. From 2004 to 2008 he was principal director of the Orquesta Ciudad de Granada in Spain.

In 2019, his son Alexandre Kantorow won the First Prize and Gold Medal at the International Tchaikovsky Competition piano category.

Selected recordings 

 Camille Saint-Sëns, Symphony in A major, Symphony n° 1 in E flat major op.2, Symphony n °2 in A minor op.55, Organ Symphony n°3 in C minor op.78, Symphony "Urbs Roma" in F, Thierry Escaich, organ, Orchestre Philharmonique Royal de Liège conducted by Jean-Jacques Kantorow. 2 SACD Bis 2021. Diapason d’or

References

External links 
[  Biography at allmusic]
 Biography at Naxos 
Agency website
J-J Kantorow tours Southern Africa, 1975. Photo dedicated to Hans Adler, tour organiser.

1945 births
Living people
People from Cannes
20th-century French male classical violinists
French male conductors (music)
Conservatoire de Paris alumni
Paganini Competition prize-winners
Long-Thibaud-Crespin Competition prize-winners
21st-century French conductors (music)
21st-century French male classical violinists